Sarupeta is a town in Bajali district, India.

On Feb 18, 2021 for the first time in Assam's history electric locomotive ran on the soil of Assam with successful trial run from Bongaigaon to Sarupeta Stations.

Etymology
The word Sarupeta derives from "Saru" meaning small and "Peta" meaning pond, thus Sarupeta means "land of small ponds".

Geography
It has an average elevation of 35 metres (114 feet). It is 44 km away from Manas National Park.

See also
 Dadara
 Uzankuri

References

External links
 Official District Website

Cities and towns in Barpeta district